William Eyang (born January 27, 1994) is a Cameroonian footballer who plays as a forward.

Career
Eyang was acquired by Orlando City B in January 2016.

Following a successful tryout, Eyang was signed by Central Florida Panthers SC ahead of its inaugural season in the National Premier Soccer League. In his fourth game with the side, Eyang scored twice and helped the Panthers earn their first win in team history.

In late 2019, Eyang signed with professional side Atlanta SC prior to the inaugural National Independent Soccer Association season.

In February 2020, Eyang joined Florida Tropics SC of the Major Arena Soccer League.

While playing with the Tropics outdoor side, Eyang won the United Premier Soccer League Spring 2021 Golden Boot, scoring 20 goals.

Eyang signed with Pittsburgh Riverhounds SC of the USL Championship on January 18, 2022.

References

External links
Orlando City B bio

1994 births
Living people
Association football forwards
Cameroonian footballers
Cameroonian expatriate footballers
Union Douala players
Bodens BK players
Orlando City B players
Florida Tropics SC players
Pittsburgh Riverhounds SC players
Expatriate footballers in Sweden
Expatriate soccer players in the United States
USL Championship players
Cameroonian expatriate sportspeople in Sweden
Cameroonian expatriate sportspeople in the United States
United Premier Soccer League players
National Premier Soccer League players
National Independent Soccer Association players
Major Arena Soccer League players
People from South Region (Cameroon)